Sirkeci railway station, listed on maps as Istanbul railway station, is a railway terminal in Istanbul, Turkey. The terminal is located in Sirkeci, on the tip of Istanbul's historic peninsula, right next to the Golden Horn and just northwest of Gülhane Park and the Topkapı Palace. Sirkeci Terminal on the European side of the Bosporus strait, along with Haydarpaşa Terminal on the Asian side, are Istanbul's two intercity and commuter railway terminals. Built in 1890 by the Oriental Railway as the eastern terminus of the world-famous Orient Express that once operated between Paris and Istanbul in the period between 1883 and 2009, Sirkeci Terminal has become a symbol of the city. As of 19 March 2013, service to the station was indefinitely suspended due to the rehabilitation of the existing line between Kazlıçeşme and Halkalı for the new Marmaray commuter rail line. On 29 October 2013, a new underground station was opened to the public and is serviced by Marmaray trains travelling across the Bosphorus. Sirkeci Terminal has a total of 4 platforms (3 above, 1 underground) with 7 tracks (5 above, 2 underground). Formerly, commuter trains to Halkalı would depart from tracks 2, 3 and 4; while regional trains to Kapıkule, Edirne and Uzunköprü, along with international trains to Bucharest, Sofia and Belgrade would depart from tracks 1 and 5.

History
After the Crimean War, the Ottoman authorities concluded that a railway connecting Europe with İstanbul was necessary. The first contract was signed with Labro, a British member of parliament, in January 1857. The contract was cancelled three months later because Labro was unable to provide the investment capital required. Similar second and third contracts signed with British and Belgian entrepreneurs in 1860 and 1868 ended with the same result. On 17 April 1869 the concession for the "Rumeli Railroad" was awarded to Baron Maurice de Hirsch (Moritz Freiherr Hirsch auf Gereuth), a Bavaria-born banker from Belgium. The project foresaw a route from İstanbul via Edirne, Plovdiv and Sarajevo to the shore of the Sava River. The construction of the first  from İstanbul to Halkalı began on 4 June 1870 and was completed on 4 January 1871. An extension of the line to Sirkeci was demanded as the starting point since Yeşilköy was too far away from Eminönü, the main business district of that epoch. The first proposed option for the line was a route from Beyazit down to the shore of the Golden Horn. The Ottoman Sultan Abdülaziz decided and permitted the route to run on the shoreline of the Sea of Marmara bordering the walls of Topkapı Palace's lower garden. The extension line was completed on 21 July 1872. In 1873, a "temporary" terminus station in Sirkeci was built.

The terminal building

The construction of a new terminal building began on 11 February 1888. The terminus, which was initially named "Müşir Ahmet Paşa Station", was opened on 3 November 1890, replacing the temporary one. The architect of the project was August Jasmund, a Prussian who was sent to İstanbul by the German government in order to study Ottoman architecture, but lectured architectural design at the School of Polytechnics in İstanbul (now Istanbul Technical University). The building was also modern, having gas lighting and heating provided by large tile stoves, made in Austria, in winter.

The terminal restaurant became a meeting point for journalists, writers and other prominent people from the media in the 1950s and 1960s. The same restaurant, today called "Orient Express", is a popular spot among tourists.

The station is preserved in its original state, but the areas around the terminal building have largely changed since 1890. The İstanbul Railway Museum, which opened in September 2005, is located in the station.

Members of the Mevlevi Dervish order regularly conduct ceremonies at Sirkeci Terminal, which tourists and other members of the public can observe for an admission fee.

International lines
Until 2013, the terminal constituted the main connection node of the Turkish railway network with the rest of Europe. The two main connecting lines are provided by the line running between Istanbul and Thessaloniki, Greece services stopped in the verge of the Greek financial crises. The Bosphorus Express ran daily between Sirkeci and Gara de Nord in Bucharest, Romania. Connections to Sofia and Belgrade were established with wagons attached to the Bosphorus Express train.

Orient Express

On 4 October 1883, the first Orient Express departed from the Gare de l'Est in Paris, with farewell music from Mozart's Turkish March. The train was a project of Belgian businessman Georges Nagelmackers. The route passed through Strasbourg, Karlsruhe, Stuttgart, Ulm, and Munich in Germany, Vienna in Austria, Budapest in Hungary, Bucharest in Romania, Rousse and Varna in Bulgaria, ending in Sirkeci. The journey of  took 80 hours.

The direct Orient Express was withdrawn on 19 May 1977, and the Orient Express via Vienna was cut back, terminating at Budapest and later Vienna. With the opening in 2007 of a new high-speed line from Paris to Strasbourg, the Orient Express was cut again to run only from Strasbourg to Vienna, before finally being entirely withdrawn in 2009 after over 130 years.

This is not to be confused with the Venice-Simplon Orient Express, a luxury tourist train using restored coaches from the 1930s. The VSOE still makes one journey per year to İstanbul, but mostly travels between Calais and Venice.

Service
Between July 2005 and February 2011, the Friendship Express, (an international InterCity train jointly operated by the Turkish State Railways (TCDD) and TrainOSE linking İstanbul and Thessaloniki, Greece) terminated at Sirkeci Railway Station.

Since May 2013 there are currently no international trains from Sirkeci Terminal. For trains to Bulgaria only, there is a replacement bus service to Halkalı from where a daily train to Sofia with through cars to Bucharest is offered.

Future 
The Turkish Ministry of Transport wants to reopen the station for local and tourist traffic.

Marmaray station

Sirkeci is an underground railway station along the trans-Bosphorus Marmaray tunnel. This underground station was opened on 29 October 2013 along with four other stations (Kazlıçeşme, Yenikapı, Üsküdar and Ayrılık Çeşmesi) on the Marmaray line. Sirkeci is serviced by TCDD trains running between Kazlıçeşme (west of Sirkeci) and Ayrılık Çeşmesi (east of Sirkeci on the Asian side) with 6- to 10-minute intervals. Once the rehabilitation of the existing rail lines are complete, Marmaray commuter service will run west to Halkalı and east to Gebze. This service is expected to commence in 2016.

Construction of the Marmaray tunnel started in 2004 and was expected to open in April 2009. However, due to several important archaeological discoveries at Yenikapı, the opening was delayed until October 2013.

Sirkeci saw 681,212 boardings in February 2017, making it the fourth busiest station on the Marmaray line. Sirkeci made up 14% of all passenger boardings on the line.

Layout

Public transport links
 Suburban train Sirkeci-Halkalı
 Several bus lines
 Istanbul Modern Tram T1
 Ferryboat Sirkeci-Kabataş
 Sea bus Sirkeci-Bostancı-Adalar
 Car-ferryboat Sirkeci-Harem
 Train-ferryboat Sirkeci Terminal-Haydarpaşa Terminal (not passenger use)
 Nearby Eminönü (200 m distance) has ferries to Kadıköy and Üsküdar
 New Marmaray suburban railway that connects European and Asian Istanbul through a tunnel under the Bosporus.

See also
 Haydarpaşa Terminal, the other major train terminal of Istanbul, on the Asian side
 List of railway stations in Turkey
 Public transport in Istanbul
 Orient Express
 Marmaray, a commuter rail line with a tunnel under the Bosphorus that connects the European railways via Sirkeci to the Asian railways.

References

External links

 Trains of Turkey - Stations, Istanbul - Sirkeci

Fatih
Golden Horn
Sirkeci
Ottoman architecture in Istanbul
Sirkeci Terminal
Railway stations opened in 1890
1890 establishments in the Ottoman Empire